Davidești is a commune in Argeș County. Muntenia, Romania. It is composed of three villages: Conțești, Davidești, and Voroveni.

References

Communes in Argeș County
Localities in Muntenia